Olena, Olenna is a Ukrainian variant of the feminine name Helen. It is of Greek origin and means "sun ray" or "shining light". Variants of the name Olena include: Alena, Elena, Jelena, Lena, Lenya, Lenochka, Olinia, Olinija, Olenya, Olinda, Olina, Lina, Olinia, Olenka, Olenochka and Olinija.

Notable people with the name include:

Olena Dvornichenko (born 1990), Israeli Olympic rhythmic gymnast
Olena Falkman (1849-1928), Swedish concert vocalist 
Olena Kryvytska (born 1987), Ukrainian fencer
Olena Muravyova (born 1867), Ukrainian opera singer and vocal teacher, awarded Merited Artist of Ukrainian SSR (1938)
Olena Nepochatenko, Ukrainian economist and academic administrator
Olena Ovchynnikova (born 1987), Ukrainian kickboxer and mixed martial artist
Olena Ronzhyna (born 1970), Ukrainian rower
Olena Vaneeva (born 1982), Ukrainian mathematician
Olena Zelenska (born 1978), First Lady of Ukraine

See also
 Olena, Illinois
 Olena, Ohio

Ukrainian feminine given names